Rhodostrophiini is a tribe of the geometer moth family (Geometridae), with about 200 species in 17 genera and five genera tentatively associated with the tribe.

Genera
Anthemoctena Warren, 1895
Apostates Warren, 1897
Apostegania Prout, 1932
Discoglypha Warren, 1896
Discomiosis Prout, 1915
Dithecodes Warren, 1900
Erythrolophus Swinhoe, 1892
Metallaxis Prout, 1932
Neonemoria Warren, 1904
Organopoda Hampson, 1893
Pseuderythrolophus Prout, 1932
Pylargosceles Prout, 1930
Rhodostrophia Hübner, 1823
Symmacra Warren, 1896
Tanaotrichia Warren, 1893
Tricentra Warren, 1900
Zalissolepis Warren, 1895

Uncertain association
Craspediopsis Warren, 1895
Lissoblemma Warren, 1902
Orthoserica Warren, 1896
Palaeaspilates Warren, 1894
Tricentroscelis Prout, 1916

References

External links 
 Neotropical Sterrhinae
 Fauna Europaea
 The Moths of Borneo